The Best of Marie Osmond is a greatest hits album from American country music singer Marie Osmond. It was released September 25, 1990 on Curb Records. The album features the biggest hits of Marie's country music career to date.

Because MGM Records owned the rights to the original recording of "Paper Roses" it was not included on this album.  Due to this she re-recorded it using the original producer and backup singers (the Jordanaires) in the same Nashville studio as the 1973 version.

Included on this album were two new songs titled "Think With Your Heart" and "Like a Hurricane".  Like A Hurricane stayed on the Billboard Hot Country Songs for 10 weeks but only peaked at number 57.

Track listing

Singles

References

Marie Osmond albums
1990 albums
1990 greatest hits albums
Albums produced by Paul Worley
Albums produced by Kyle Lehning
Curb Records compilation albums